Timothy John Reeder (born 1969) is an American doctor and politician who is the representative of District 9 in the North Carolina House of Representatives.

Early life and education
Reeder was born in Columbus, Ohio, and attended Catholic school. He later attended Ohio State University for both his undergraduate and medical degrees. He moved to North Carolina in 1998 where he earned a Master's Degree in Public Health from the University of North Carolina at Chapel Hill, and served as President of the North Carolina Medical Society in 2019. He has worked at the Brody School of Medicine at East Carolina University and as Chief of Medical Staff at Vidant Medical Center.

North Carolina General Assembly 
Reeder announced his candidacy for the 9th district, located in Pitt County on December 20, 2021. He won the Republican primary on May 17, 2022, defeating his opponent, Tony P. Moore, by a margin of 908 votes.

Reeder campaigned on opposing abortion and critical race theory while supporting lowering taxes. He criticized Governor Roy Cooper and incumbent Brian Farkas for inflation. He stated that he supported Medicaid expansion and accepted the results of the 2020 United States Presidential Election.

On November 8, 2022, Reeder defeated Brian Farkas in a narrow election. His victory was one of several Republican gains in the 2022 North Carolina House of Representatives election.

Electoral history

References

External links
 Tim Reeder Campaign Website

Living people
1969 births
People from Columbus, Ohio
Politicians from Columbus, Ohio
People from Pitt County, North Carolina
Ohio State University alumni
University of North Carolina at Chapel Hill alumni
21st-century American politicians
Republican Party members of the North Carolina House of Representatives